Jean Dumont (27 November 1930 – 18 January 2021) was a French politician. Prior to his political career, he worked as a veterinarian. In the Senate, he served on the Committee of Social Affairs.

Dumont's son, Alain, served as a municipal councillor for Thouars.

References

French Senators of the Fifth Republic

1930 births
2021 deaths
People from Deux-Sèvres